The Bras Saint-Michel is a tributary of the north-west bank of the Rivière du Sud (Montmagny) which flows north-east to the south bank of the St. Lawrence River, in the administrative region of Chaudière-Appalaches, in Quebec, in Canada.

The "Bras Saint-Michel" crosses the MRC of:
 Bellechasse Regional County Municipality: municipalities of Saint-Henri, Saint-Gervais, Saint-Charles-de-Bellechasse, La Durantaye, Saint-Raphaël, Saint-Vallier;
 Montmagny Regional County Municipality: municipality of Saint-François-de-la-Rivière-du-Sud.

Geography 
This spring is located in an agricultural zone north of the Boyer River and northwest of the first rang West road. The "Bras Saint-Michel" flows relatively in a straight line north-east in parallel (on the south-east side) over the Boyer river.

  northeasterly in Saint-Henri, up to the limit of Saint-Charles-de-Bellechasse;
  towards the northeast, forming the limit between these last two municipalities;
  north-east to the limit of Saint-Gervais;
  northeasterly, forming the limit of the municipalities of Saint-Gervais and Saint-Charles-de-Bellechasse, up to the road bridge to La Tremblade, that is to at the limit of La Durantaye;
  towards the north-east, forming the limit between La Durantaye and Saint-Gervais;
  northeasterly, forming the limit between La Durantaye and Saint-Raphaël, to the route Robert bridge;
  towards the northeast, forming on  the limit between Saint-Vallier and Saint-Raphaël, until 'at the limit of Saint-François-de-la-Rivière-du-Sud;
  northeasterly in Saint-François-de-la-Rivière-du-Sud, to its confluence.

The "Bras Saint-Michel" empties on the north-west bank of the Rivière du Sud (Montmagny) in the municipality of Saint-François-de-la-Rivière-du-Sud.

Toponymy 
The toponym "Bras Saint-Michel" was made official on December 5, 1968, at the Commission de toponymie du Québec.

See also 

 List of rivers of Quebec

References 

Rivers of Chaudière-Appalaches
Montmagny Regional County Municipality
Bellechasse Regional County Municipality